Sandferhus station was a railway station on the Nordland Line at Værnes in Stjørdal municipality in Trøndelag, Norway. The station opened on 1 July 1953 and was known as Sandfærhus until November 1953. Train services stopped on 20 May 1988 and the station was officially closed on 28 May 1989.

References

Railway stations in Stjørdal
Railway stations on the Nordland Line
Railway stations opened in 1953
Railway stations closed in 1989
1953 establishments in Norway